Nikolay Karlovich Svanidze (born 2 April 1955 in Moscow) is a Russian TV and radio host and member of the Public Chamber of Russia.

Biography
Nikolai Karlovich Svanidze is named after his paternal grandfather Nikolai Samsonovich Svanidze.

The grandfather, Nikolai Samsonovich Svanidze, was a distant relative of Joseph Stalin's first wife Kato Svanidze — who took an active part in the October revolution and served as a high-ranking official in the Transcaucasian Socialist Federative Soviet Republic under the protection of Sergo Ordzhonikidze. The grandfather was married to Zilya Isaakovna Luskina, also a Bolshevik revolutionary of Jewish origin who worked at the Zhenotdel structure. In 1937 he was arrested and executed among other Georgian officials who promoted exclusive rights for the Georgian SSR, including xenophobic laws for non-Georgian residents. The mother of Nikolay Karlovich was Adelaida (Ada) Anatolievna Svanidze (born Kryzanowskaya), a Soviet and Russian historian, professor and doctor of sciences.

Nikolai Karlovich Svanidze graduated from the History Department of Moscow State University in 1977. In 1977-1990 he was a research fellow in the Institute for US and Canadian Studies. Since 1991 he has worked for the All-Russia State Television and Radio Company and has been a host on its Russia TV channel, in 1996-2007 authoring and hosting the weekly analytical program "Zerkalo" ('Mirror'). Both of his grandfathers were executed under Stalin's regime in 1937. The rest of his family, during the repressions of 1939, was sent to the Gulag.

In February 1997 - May 1998 Svanidze was the chairman of the company, appointed by President Boris Yeltsin. In an interview Svanidze himself confessed that as a TV host on the side of the government he was heavily involved in the 1999 parliamentary election campaign, attacking the Communist Party of the Russian Federation and the Fatherland – All Russia block. In 2003 Svanidze started to make the TV documentary series Historical Chronicles, highly critical of the Bolsheviks and Joseph Stalin in particular, in each part telling about a personality from a single year of the 20th century history of Russia. In 2005 he became a member of the Public Chamber of Russia. In 2008 together with his wife Marina Svanidze, he published the book Medvedev based on interviews with the Russian president Dmitry Medvedev.

References

External links
EJ
NashFilm
NS

Members of the Civic Chamber of the Russian Federation
Russian television presenters
Russian journalists
21st-century Russian historians
Russian people of Georgian descent
1955 births
Living people